Sustainability at the University of British Columbia (UBC) is accomplished by integrating sustainability into the learning experience.

Climate change is now the most serious global environmental threat. Its potential impacts include global warming, sea level rise, and increased extreme weather events. Climate change is a direct consequence of elevated greenhouse gas concentrations in the atmosphere.

Greenhouse gases are gases that trap heat in the atmosphere. Some examples include Carbon dioxide, Methane, and Nitrous oxide. They are emitted from fossil fuel burning. Electricity production generates the largest share of greenhouse gas emissions. Moreover, other sources include transportation, industry, and agriculture.

Effects of greenhouse gases 
These gases are said to make the planet warmer by "thickening the Earth’s blanket." This can lead to the overall average annual temperature to increase. Moreover, global warming will decrease snow and glaciers resulting in rising sea levels and increased coastal flooding. In addition, continued warming from the release of greenhouse gases into the atmosphere is expected to have substantial impacts on the economy, other environmental issues and human health.

Warming is likely to worsen conditions for air quality and increase the risk of heat-related illnesses. In addition, the frequency and strength of extreme event such as floods and storms are likely to threaten safety and health. In turn, warming temperatures are likely to change water resources which affect many areas, including energy production, human health, agriculture, and ecosystems.

Steam to hot water conversion action plan
In 2011, the University of British Columbia (UBC) created one of the largest steam to hot water conversions to replace UBC's old steam system. The new system will increase operational efficiencies by reducing heat distribution losses. It will heat the campus while operating at a significantly lower average temperature of 80 °C, rather than 190 °C and as a result, it will result in substantial energy and financial savings. The campus has used natural gas for heat since the 1960s. The new "neighborhood district energy system" will use high-efficiency natural gas boilers.

New system's purpose
The main purpose of this project is to reduce campus greenhouse gas emissions. The new hot water system will reduce UBC's district heating system energy use by 24 per cent. Furthermore, it will reduce UBC's greenhouse gas emissions by 22 per cent. To save money on operational and energy costs and to advance clean energy research and development opportunities. For example, it will save 4 million a year in operational and energy costs. Moreover, to facilitate a long-term target of eliminating the use of fossil fuels on campus by 2050.

Progress
UBC's steam heating system pipes run underground. The hot water conversion will occur in nine different construction phases to minimize campus disruption. For example, phases two through seven will be completed from 2012 to 2015. They will be used to reduce natural gas consumption on campus.

See also
Efficient energy use

References

University of British Columbia